Neimen District is a rural district of Kaohsiung in southern Taiwan. Neimen is located in the mountainous area with very little flat land. Qishan River passes through the Neimen district. The whole district is under water reserve protection. The climate of Neimen belongs to the tropical monsoon climate.

History
After the handover of Taiwan from Japan to the Republic of China in 1945, Neimen was organized as a rural township of Kaohsiung County. On 25 December 2010, Kaohsiung County was merged with Kaohsiung City and Neimen was upgraded to a district of the city.

Quick facts 
Area: 95.6224 km2.
Population: 13,454 people (January 2023)
Divisions: 18 urban villages 196 Neighborhoods
Postal Code: 845 
Households: 5,074

Administrative divisions
The district consists of Gouping, Jinzhu, Yongfu, Yongji, Yongxing, Shikeng, Neimen, Neili, Guanting, Zhongpu, Neitung, Neinan, Tungpu, Sanping, Muzha, Neixing, Ruishan and Guangxing Village.

Economy
The major occupation in the district is farming. However, the district is also famous for its roadside banquet culture.

Education
 Shih Chien University

Tourist attractions
 308 Highland
 Neimen Zhi-jhu Temple (內門紫竹寺)
 Seven Star Towers
 Tsui-Wen School
 Volunteer Soldier Temple
 Neimen Zhiyun Temple (內門紫雲宮)
 Neimen Shunxian Temple (順賢宮)

See also 
 Kaohsiung

References

External links 

 

Districts of Kaohsiung